Çankaya is a neighbourhood of the Çankaya district in Ankara, Turkey.

Locally located structures
Çankaya Mansion
Atakule
Ankara Botanic Park
Turkish Revenue Administration

Demographics

References

Neighbourhoods of Çankaya
Populated places in Ankara Province